"Down East", also "Downeast", is a term for parts of eastern coastal New England and Canada, particularly the U.S. state of Maine and Canada's Maritime Provinces, an area that closely corresponds to the historical French territory of Acadia. The phrase apparently derives from sailing terminology: sailors from western ports sailed downwind toward the east to reach the area.

A person from this area may be called a "down-easter." Within Maine, the phrase "down east" may refer specifically to the state's easternmost regions, also called Down East Maine.

The Downeast Maine National Heritage Area was established in the National Heritage Area Act in 2022. The National Heritage Area will help preserve more historic and cultural sites in Hancock and Washington counties.

Etymology
The origin of the phrase "Down East" is typically traced to nautical terminology referring to direction, rather than location. In the warm months most suitable for sailing, the prevailing winds along the coast of New England and Canada blow from the southwest, meaning ships sail downwind to go east. As such, the northeastern stretches were said to be "Down East" in relation to major western cities such as Boston. Correspondingly, sailors spoke of going "up to Boston" from Down East ports, a phrase still common in Maine, despite the fact that Boston is around fifty miles to the south of Maine. The term can be used as an adverb, adjective, or noun. The Oxford English Dictionary traces the earliest known use in print to 1825. The phrase "down-easter", meaning a person from "Down East", appeared in print in 1828.

Uses

The phrase "Down East" is used in several ways. Most broadly, it refers to areas from northeastern New England into Canada's Maritime Provinces. Sargent F. Collier wrote that Down East extended from Maine into Canada as far as Chaleur Bay. This area is similar to the boundaries of the historical French colony of Acadia; Collier regarded this as a cultural legacy of the former colony. According to Maine author John Gould, Down East is "a never-never land always east of where you are". The term is relational, with Boston being the traditional referent for determining what is "Down East". As such, sailors going from one port in Maine to another nearby may have said they were going "down Maine" or "east'ard", reserving "Down East" for farther points.

Within New England, "Down East" often refers specifically to Maine, especially the coastal areas. The phrase has widespread use in the state; Maine's largest monthly magazine is titled Down East. Amtrak named its passenger train service between Boston and Brunswick, Maine the Downeaster. The term "Down East" provided the name for a prominent type of sailing ship developed in Maine in the later 19th century, the Down Easter. Down Easters were a modification of the earlier clipper, with new lines and rigging enabling it to carry substantially more cargo. Primarily used to transport wheat and other goods from California to European markets, Down Easters were characteristically built in Maine, and their captains often came from the state. A significant part of Maine's maritime legacy, they were among the last prominent sailing ships built before steamships came to dominate the industry. While steamships may have supplanted sailing ships in some contexts, Maine boatbuilders continued to build some of the highest quality sailing yachts and motor yachts. Maine boatbuilders such as Sabre Yachts (and sister-company Back Cove Yachts), Hinckley, Lyman-Morse, and others have continued to carry the torch for Maine's boatbuilding legacy, and are considered some of the finest boatbuilders in the world. Heavily influenced by the ever-present lobster boats that are found in every Maine port, the downeast style motor yacht is one of the most sought after designs available today. Other boatbuilders have attempted to mimic the characteristics of the style under variations of the 'downeast' name. 

In Maine, "Down East" may refer more narrowly to the easternmost section of the state along the Canada–US border. This area, also known as "Down East Maine" or "Downeast Maine", lies on the coast roughly between the Penobscot River and the border, including rural Hancock and Washington counties and the towns of Deer Isle, Bar Harbor, Machias, Jonesport, and Eastport. This was among the last parts of the state settled by Europeans. Due to its thankless climate it saw little settlement by the French, and British colonists arrived only after French control ended in 1763. Initially attracted by the availability of land for farming, the early British settlers soon turned to fishing to survive; fishing remains a significant economic driver. Largely due to its inhospitable climate and remoteness, Down East Maine remained one of the state's least developed areas throughout the 20th century. In more recent years, Down East Maine and the Greater Portland area have emerged as an important center for the creative economy, which is also bringing gentrification.

In Canada, "Down East" typically refers to the Maritime Provinces: New Brunswick, Nova Scotia, and Prince Edward Island. Newfoundland and the Gaspé Peninsula of Quebec are sometimes included. The term gave its name to Down East fiddling, which developed in the Maritimes and has become one of the most prominent styles of Canadian fiddling. The style is closely associated with New Brunswick native Don Messer, who hosted a radio show on Prince Edward Island beginning in 1939 and had a wide influence over fiddle music in Canada. The Down East style is distinguished by simple playing and dance-ready rhythms.

References

External links 

 Downeast Maine National Heritage Area

Culture of the Maritimes
Geography of the Maritimes
Maine culture
Regions of Maine